John Williams (August 30, 1817 – February 7, 1899) was the eleventh presiding bishop of the Protestant Episcopal Church in the United States of America.

Early life
Williams was born at Deerfield, Massachusetts, the son of Ephraim Williams and Emily (Trowbridge) Williams.  He was educated at Deerfield Academy, Harvard and at Trinity College, Hartford, where he graduated in 1835.  Although his parents were Unitarian, Williams's time at Harvard convinced him to join the Protestant Episcopal Church. He was ordained deacon in 1838 and priest in 1841. Williams held the rectorship of St. George's Church, Schenectady, New York, from 1842 to 1848, after which he became president of Trinity College, and at the same time professor of history and literature there.

Bishop of Connecticut
In 1851, Williams was elected Assistant Bishop of Connecticut. He was the 53rd bishop, and was consecrated by Bishops Thomas Church Brownell, John Henry Hopkins, and William Heathcote DeLancey. In 1854, Williams founded Berkeley Divinity School at Middletown, and held the office of dean as well as being principal instructor in Church history and theology at the School. On the death of Bishop Brownell in 1865, Williams succeeded him in the sole charge of the diocese, remaining Dean of Berkeley Divinity School also.

Presiding bishop
Williams succeeded Alfred Lee of Delaware as presiding bishop in 1887, and earned the reputation of a wise conservative leader in ecclesiastical affairs.  In 1896, he was acknowledged as the senior bishop in the Anglican communion.

Works
Among his published works are:
 Thoughts on the Gospel Miracles (1848)
 The English Reformation (Paddock Lectures, 1881)
 The World's Witness to Jesus Christ (Bedell Lectures, 1882)
 Studies in the Book of the Acts (1888)

See also
 List of presiding bishops of the Episcopal Church in the United States of America
 List of Episcopal bishops of the United States
 Historical list of the Episcopal bishops of the United States

Notes

References

External links

Documents by Williams from Project Canterbury
 
 

People from Deerfield, Massachusetts
Harvard University alumni
Trinity College (Connecticut) faculty
American religious writers
1817 births
1899 deaths
Presiding Bishops of the Episcopal Church in the United States of America
19th-century Anglican bishops in the United States
Trinity College (Connecticut) alumni
Episcopal Church in Connecticut
Presidents of Trinity College (Connecticut)
Episcopal bishops of Connecticut